Socratic is an education tech company that offers a mobile app for students. The app uses AI technology to help students with their homework by providing educational resources like videos, definitions, Q&A, links and more.

Socratic was first launched as a web product in 2013 by Chris Pedregal and Shreyans Bhansali, in New York City, United States. They launched their app under the same name in 2016.

In March 2018, Socratic was acquired by Google for an undisclosed amount. The acquisition was made public in August 2019, when the Founder and CTO (now engineering manager) Shreyans Bhansali announced that the company had joined Google. The wake of news was accompanied by a redesigned iOS app.

Starting from August 2018, Socratic became no longer available for user contributions; past contributions were kept, but it was no longer possible to ask, answer, or edit questions.

Technology
The Socratic app utilizes artificial intelligence to accurately predict which concepts will help a student solve their question. Over months, millions of real student questions were analyzed and classified. Then the app uses that data to guess on future questions and provide specific education content.

The app works by letting students take a photo of a homework question, a feature that was later added to Google Lens. Using Optical character recognition (OCR), the app is able to read their photo and classify it using the technology described above. Students receive various "cards" in the app with different learning resources such as definitions, YouTube videos, Q&A, and original content and illustrations written by the Socratic.org web community.

In January 2017, Socratic added additional Math features to the app, including step-by-step equation help and graphs.

Subjects
There is currently a total of four main groups of subjects on Socratic:
Science
Anatomy and Physiology
Astronomy
Astrophysics
Biology
Chemistry
Earth Science
Environmental Science
Organic Chemistry
Physics
Math
Algebra
Calculus
Geometry
Prealgebra
Precalculus
Statistics
Trigonometry
Social Science
Psychology
Humanities
English Grammar
U.S. History
World History

See also
 Boundless
Codecademy
 Khan Academy
 Quora
 ResearchGate
 Stack Exchange

References

Further reading

External links
 

American science websites
Scholarly communication
Educational technology companies of the United States
Companies based in New York (state)
American companies established in 2013
2018 mergers and acquisitions
Google acquisitions
Google services